Klenzsee is a lake in the Mecklenburgische Seenplatte district in Mecklenburg-Vorpommern, Germany. At an elevation of 57.5 m, its surface area is 0.74 km².

Lakes of Mecklenburg-Western Pomerania